Patrick Marcy (born October 6, 1950) is an American wrestler. He competed in the men's Greco-Roman 68 kg at the 1976 Summer Olympics.

References

1950 births
Living people
American male sport wrestlers
Olympic wrestlers of the United States
Wrestlers at the 1976 Summer Olympics
Sportspeople from Minneapolis
Pan American Games medalists in wrestling
Pan American Games gold medalists for the United States
Wrestlers at the 1975 Pan American Games
Medalists at the 1975 Pan American Games
20th-century American people
21st-century American people